Gibbet Hill is a summit in the U.S. state of Massachusetts.

According to tradition, the name recalls an incident when an Indian was gibbeted upon the summit.

References

Groton, Massachusetts
Mountains of Middlesex County, Massachusetts
Mountains of Massachusetts